The following notable old boys of Eton College were born in the 18th century.

1700s
Thomas Morell (1703–1784), classical scholar
Henry Fox, 1st Baron Holland (1705–1774), Secretary at War, 1746–1754, Secretary of State for the Southern Department, 1755–1756, and Paymaster-General, 1757–1765
Henry Fielding (1707–1754), novelist
Other Windsor, 3rd Earl of Plymouth (1707–1732) 
William Pitt, 1st Earl of Chatham (1708–1778), Paymaster-General, 1746–1755, Secretary of State for the Southern Department, 1756–1757, 1757–1761, and Prime Minister, 1766–1768
Francis Dashwood, 11th Baron le Despencer (1708–1781), Chancellor of the Exchequer, 1762–1763
George Lyttelton, 1st Baron Lyttelton (1709–1773), Chancellor of the Exchequer, 1755–1756
Thomas Arne (1710–1778), composer

1710s
George Grenville (1712–1770), First Lord of the Admiralty, 1762–1763, Prime Minister and Chancellor of the Exchequer, 1763–1765
Edward Cornwallis (1713–1776), Lieutenant-General and founder of Halifax, Nova Scotia
Frederick Cornwallis (1713–1783), Bishop of Lichfield and Coventry, 1750–1766, Dean of St Paul's, 1766–1768, and Archbishop of Canterbury, 1768–1783
John Stuart, 3rd Earl of Bute (1713–1792), Secretary of State for the Northern Department, 1761–1762, and Prime Minister, 1762–1763
Henry Bathurst, 2nd Earl Bathurst (1714–1794), Lord Chancellor, 1771–1778
Charles Lyttelton (1714–1768), Bishop of Carlisle, 1762–1768, and antiquary
Charles Pratt, 1st Earl Camden (1714–1794), Lord Chancellor, 1766–1770
Thomas Gray (1716–1771), poet
Horace Walpole, 4th Earl of Orford (1717–1797), author and politician
John Montagu, 4th Earl of Sandwich (1718–1792), First Lord of the Admiralty, 1748–1751, 1771–1782, and Secretary of State for the Northern Department, 1763–1765, 1770–1771
George Selwyn (1719–1791), politician and wit
Edward Weston (1703–1770), politician and Chief Secretary of Ireland

1720s
Lieutenant-General John Manners, Marquess of Granby (1721–1770), Master-General of the Ordnance, 1763–1766, and Commander-in-Chief of the Forces, 1766–1770
Daniel Dulany the Younger (1722–1797), Maryland Loyalist politician, Mayor of Annapolis, and lawyer.
William Lyttelton, 1st Baron Lyttelton of Frankley (1724–1808), Governor of South Carolina, 1756–1760, and Jamaica, 1762–1766, and Ambassador to Portugal, 1766–1771
Brigadier-General George Howe, 3rd Viscount Howe (1725–1758), soldier
Sir David Dalrymple, Lord Hailes (1726–1792), advocate, historian, and Scottish Lord of Session, 1766–1792, and Lord of Justiciary, 1776–1792
Admiral of the Fleet Richard Howe, 1st Earl Howe (1726–1799), Commander-in-Chief, North American Station, 1775–1778, First Lord of the Admiralty, 1783–1788, and Vice-Admiral of England, 1792–1796
General William Howe, 5th Viscount Howe (1729–1814), Commander-in-Chief, North America, 1775–1778, and Lieutenant-General of Ordnance, 1782–1803

1730s
Frederick North, 2nd Earl of Guildford (8th Baron North) (1732–1792), Chancellor of the Exchequer, 1767–1770, and Prime Minister, 1770–1782
Sir James Mansfield (1733–1821), Solicitor General, 1780–1782, and Lord Chief Justice of Common Pleas, 1804–1814
Shute Barrington (1734–1826), Bishop of Llandaff, 1769–1782, Salisbury, 1782–1791, and Durham, 1791–1826
John Horne Tooke (1736–1812), politician and philologist
Henry Penruddocke Wyndham (1736–1819), politician and topographer
General Charles Cornwallis, 1st Marquess Cornwallis (1738–1805), Governor-General of India, 1786–1793, Master-General of the Ordnance, 1795–1801, and Viceroy of Ireland, 1798–1801

1740s
Henry Jerome de Salis FRS (1740–1810), clergyman and antiquarian
Sir Joseph Banks (1743–1820), naturalist and President of the Royal Society, 1778–1820
Thomas Lyttelton, 2nd Baron Lyttelton (1744–1779), politician
Thomas Fyshe Palmer (1747–1802), Unitarian minister
William Coxe (1747–1828), historian
Sir Uvedale Price (1747–1829), author
George Robert FitzGerald (c.1748–1786), Irish eccentric, charged with murder
Charles James Fox (1749–1806), Secretary of State for Foreign Affairs, 1782, 1783, 1806
Thomas Lynch, Jr. (1749–1779), signatory of the United States Declaration of Independence

1750s
John Graves Simcoe (1752-1806)Army officer, founder of Toronto
Lord George Gordon (1751–1793), politician and agitator
Charles Stanhope, 3rd Earl Stanhope (1753–1816), politician and scientist
George Cranfield Berkeley (1753–1818), senior Royal Navy admiral
Sir George Beaumont, 7th Baronet (1753–1827), art patron
General John Hely-Hutchinson, 2nd Earl of Donoughmore (1757–1832), Commander-in-Chief, Egypt, 1801
Lieutenant-Colonel John Enys (1757–1818), soldier
William Grenville, 1st Baron Grenville (1759–1834), Secretary of State for Foreign Affairs, 1791–1801, and Prime Minister, 1806–1807
Richard Porson (1759–1808), Regius Professor of Greek, University of Cambridge, 1792–1808
Richard Wellesley, 1st Marquess Wellesley (1760–1842), Governor-General of India, 1797–1805, Secretary of State for Foreign Affairs, 1809–1812, and Lord Lieutenant of Ireland, 1821–1828, 1833–1834

1760s
William Wellesley-Pole, 3rd Earl of Mornington (1763–1845), Chief Secretary for Ireland, 1809–1812, and Master of the Mint, 1814–1823
Charles Grey, 2nd Earl Grey (1764–1845), Secretary of State for Foreign Affairs, 1806–1807, and Prime Minister, 1830–1834
Mad Jack Fuller (1757–1834), eccentric philanthropist, Member of Parliament for Southampton from 1780 to 1784, and Member of Parliament for Sussex from 1801 to 1812. 
Field Marshal Arthur Wellesley, 1st Duke of Wellington (1769–1852), Commander, Mysore, 1799–1802, the Deccan, 1803–1805, and the Iberian Peninsula, 1808–1814, Master-General of the Ordnance, 1818–1827, Commander-in-Chief of the Forces, 1827–1828, 1842–1852, and Prime Minister, 1828–1830, 1834
George Canning (1770–1827), Secretary of State for Foreign Affairs, 1807–1809, 1822–1827, Prime Minister and Chancellor of the Exchequer, 1827

1770s
John Keate (1773–1852), Headmaster of Eton, 1809–1834
Edward Vernon Utterson (c. 1776–1856), lawyer, one of the Six Clerks in Chancery, literary antiquary, collector and editor
George 'Beau' Brummell (1778–1840), dandy
John Rogers (1778–1856), theologian, landlord and scientist.
John Broadhurst (1778-1861), British Member of Parliament 
William Lamb, 2nd Viscount Melbourne (1779–1848), Home Secretary, 1830–1834, and Prime Minister, 1834, 1835–1841
John Bird Sumner (1780–1862), Bishop of Chester, 1828–1848, and Archbishop of Canterbury, 1848–1862

1780s
John Bettesworth-Trevanion (1780–1840), MP for Penryn
Francis Hodgson (1781–1852), Provost of Eton (1840–1852)
Stratford Canning, 1st Viscount Stratford de Redcliffe (1786–1880), ambassador
John Lonsdale (1788–1867), Principal of King's College London (1838–1843), Bishop of Lichfield (1843–1867)
Charles Richard Sumner (1790–1874), Bishop of Winchester, 1827–1874

1790s
Francis James Newman Rogers KC (1791–1851), judge and legal author
Sir John Herschel (1792–1871), astronomer and mathematician
John George Lambton, 1st Earl of Durham (1792–1840), Governor-General of Canada, 1838–1840, and politician
Percy Bysshe Shelley (1792–1822), poet
Henry Michell Wagner (1792–1870), Vicar of Brighton (1824–1870)
John Crichton-Stuart, 2nd Marquess of Bute
Major-General Sir George Cathcart (1794–1854) Governor of Cape Colony, 1852–1853
Charles Cavendish Fulke Greville (1794–1865), Clerk of the Privy Council, 1821–1859
Rees Howell Gronow (1794–1865), Welsh Grenadier Guards officer and memoirist
Samuel Jones-Loyd, Baron Overstone (1796–1883), Banker and politician
Joseph Henry Blake (1797–1849), Irish peer and socialist
Sir John George Shaw-Lefevre (1797–1879), Vice-Chancellor, University of London, 1842–1862, and Clerk of the Parliaments, 1855–1875
Richard William Jelf (1798–1871), Principal of King's College London (1843–1868)
William Evans (1798–1877), painter and schoolmaster at Eton
Thomas Denman, 1st Baron Denman (1799–1854), Attorney General, 1830–1832, and Lord Chief Justice, 1832–1850
Edward Smith-Stanley, 14th Earl of Derby (1799–1869), Colonial Secretary, 1833–1834, and Prime Minister, 1852, 1858–1859, 1866–1868
Edward Pusey (1800–1882), Regius Professor of Hebrew, University of Oxford, 1828–1882
John Pakington, 1st Baron Hampton (1799–1880) Politician

See also
List of Old Etonians born before the 18th century
List of Old Etonians born in the 19th century
List of Old Etonians born in the 20th century

 
Lists of people associated with Eton College
Old Etonians
18th century in England